Andrew Nicholas Petersen (March 10, 1870 – September 28, 1953) was a patternmaker and foundry company executive who served as a U.S. Representative from New York.

Early life
Born near Thisted, Denmark, Petersen immigrated to the United States in 1873 with his parents, Tyler and Hansine (Furst) Petersen.  They settled first in Boston before moving to New York City in 1879.  He attended the public schools and learned the patternmaker's trade.

Business career
Petersen later became an executive in the metal working industry, and served as president of Brooklyn's Whale Creek Iron Works.  In addition, Petersen was an officer and member of the board of governors of the Employers' Association of Architectural Iron Workers.  He was also active in a real estate sales and development company, Farragut Realty.  In 1897, he invented an iron staircase for tenement houses, for which he received a patent.  Petersen served as president of the Brooklyn Foundry Company from 1900 to 1952.  His companies were active in construction throughout the New York City area, including fulfilling contracts for elevator fronts, staircases, railings, columns, building fronts, and other building components.

Election to Congress
Petersen was elected as a Republican to the Sixty-seventh Congress (March 4, 1921 – March 3, 1923).  He was an unsuccessful candidate for reelection in 1922 to the Sixty-eighth Congress.  In 1924, he was the unsuccessful Republican nominee for the Congressional seat he had previously held.

Panama incident
In 1923, President Warren G. Harding, and Edwin Denby, the Secretary of the Navy, requested that Petersen and another former Republican Congressman from New York, Albert B. Rossdale travel to the Panama Canal Zone to make firsthand observations on living and working conditions for Navy sailors, and make recommendations for improvements.  Intending to conduct their investigation undercover, Petersen and Rossdale joined the crew of the battleship USS New York, donned sailors' uniforms, had dinner with the crew, and then departed with them for shore leave.  Upon entering a Panamanian cabaret, they were arrested by members of the Navy shore patrol and charged with being at liberty after 11 PM, in violation of Naval regulations.  They remained in detention until they revealed their identities and the captain of the New York wired the shore patrol instructions to release Petersen and Rossdale.  Rather than the planned undercover operation, the investigation Rossdale and Petersen intended degenerated into farce; when the media became aware of the events, they generated satirical headlines that showed the principals and the Harding administration in a negative light.

Death and burial
Peterson died in East Rockaway, New York on September 28, 1953.  He was buried in Cypress Hills Abbey, Brooklyn, New York.

Family
In 1896, Petersen married to Olga E. Holck.  They were the parents of three children, daughter Shirley M., and sons Harry E. and Elliott I.  Harry Petersen succeeded his father as president of the Brooklyn Foundry Company.  Elliott Petersen was vice president of production for the Bigelow-Sanford Carpet Company.

References

Sources

Books

Newspapers
 (Note: Headline and article give incorrect middle initial.)

Magazines

External sources

1870 births
1953 deaths
Businesspeople from New York (state)
Danish emigrants to the United States
Patternmakers (industrial)
People from Thisted Municipality
Republican Party members of the United States House of Representatives from New York (state)